Sathyan Mokeri (born 2 October 1953) is an Indian communist politician. He represented Nadapuram constituency in the Kerala Legislative Assembly  from 1987 to 2001. In 2015, he was elected the Assistant Secretary of Communist Party of India Kerala State Committee.

Positions Held
Member, Calicut University Senate 
Member, C.P.I State Executive Committee 
President, AISF, Koshikode District Committee and State Committee
Secretary and President, AIYF Kerala State Committee
Vice President, AIYF National Council,
Vice President, All India Kisan Sabha State Committee

References

1953 births
Indian political people
Living people
Communist Party of India politicians from Kerala
Communist Party of India candidates in the 2014 Indian general election